The 2009 FIA GT Championship season was the thirteenth and final season of the FIA GT Championship for grand tourer cars competing in the GT1 and GT2 categories. The season began 3 May, and ended 25 October after eight races. This was also the final season of a combined GT1 and GT2 championship before the launch of the FIA GT1 World Championship in 2010.

Vitaphone Racing Team Maserati drivers Michael Bartels and Andrea Bertolini successfully defended their GT1 Championships, pulling clear of the rivals in the final two events of the season after a close battle with the Peka Racing Chevrolet team of Anthony Kumpen and Mike Hezemans. Bartels and Bertolini won races at Adria International Raceway and Hungaroring in the way to the title, a third championship each for the pair. With the assistance of Miguel Ramos and Alex Müller in the team's second Maserati MC12 GT1, Vitaphone Racing Team also secured the Teams Championship.

In the lower specification GT2 category, former Porsche Supercup champion Richard Westbrook won the GT2 championship, driving a Prospeed Competition Porsche. Westbrook won the title by just two points over AF Corse Ferrari pairing of Gianmaria Bruni and Toni Vilander. Controversially Westbrook was split from his season long partner Emmanuel Collard at the final round, swapping cars with Brixia Racing driver Marco Holzer in a successful attempt to maximise Porsche's chances of defeating the Ferrari pairing. AF Corse, with the help of the team's second car of Álvaro Barba and Niki Cadei, did defeat Prospeed in the teams championship. CRS Racing driver Chris Niarchos was awarded the Citation Cup for amateur drivers.

Schedule
The 2009 schedule was initially announced by the FIA on 5 November 2008, with seven events consisting of two-hour races, the Bucharest City Challenge of two separate one-hour races, and the Spa 24 Hours. Adria's event was once again scheduled to take place at night. However at a further meeting of the FIA on 17 March 2009 the calendar was set at eight rounds, with the cancellation of the Potrero de los Funes event and the inclusion of Circuit Paul Ricard. This decreased the number of two-hour races from seven to six.

On 16 June the Bucharest Ring, Romania cancelled their planned FIA GT event. The series therefore replaced the fifth round with an event at the Hungaroring in Hungary which would return to the normal two-hour race format.

Entry list

GT1

GT2

Season results
Overall winners in bold.

Championships
Points were awarded to the top eight finishers in the order of 10–8–6–5–4–3–2–1. Cars which failed to complete 75% of the winner's distance were not awarded points.  Drivers who did not drive for at least 35 minutes do not receive points.

Driver championships

GT1 standings

GT2 standings

Citation Cup
New for 2009, the Citation Cup involved amateur drivers in the GT2 category rather than the GT1 category used since 2007.  Drivers rated as bronze by the GT Bureau driver classification system were allowed to enter the Citation Cup if they competed in a car which was homologated before 2009.  Points in the Citation Cup were awarded at every FIA GT round except for the Spa 24 Hours.

Team championships

GT1 standings
The Nissan Motorsports entry was not allowed to score championship points due to being run as a factory team.

GT2 standings

Manufacturers Cups

Results of the GT2 Manufacturers’ Cup were as follows.
Although a GT1 Manufacturers’ Cup was listed in the Sporting Regulations for the 2009 FIA GT Championship, no points table for this award was published.  An award was given only for the manufacturers in the GT2 category.

References

External links

 FIA GT Championship
 Official Live Stream Supplier
 Sporting Regulations as archived at www.webcitation.org on 21 December 2009
 Technical Regulations for Grand Touring Cars – GT1 as archived at www.webcitation.org on 21 December 2009
 Technical Regulations for Grand Touring Cars – GT2 as archived at www.webcitation.org on 21 December 2009
 FIA Classifications as archived at www.webcitation.org on 21 December 2009
 2009 FIA GT Championship images

 
FIA GT Championship seasons